Shefford Woodlands is a village in West Berkshire, England, about  northeast of the market town of Hungerford.

History
Shefford Woodlands developed where the road linking Hungerford and Wantage (later a turnpike, now the A338) crossed the Roman road of Ermin Street linking Silchester and Gloucester. Woodlands House and the barn next to White House were built in the 18th century. The barn is a timber-framed building, originally of six bays, and enlarged in the 19th century. Both are now Grade II listed buildings. In the 19th and 20th centuries there were significant Wesleyan and Primitive Methodist congregations in Great Shefford parish, and Shefford Woodlands had a Methodist chapel. It fell into disuse, but then in 1911 was consecrated as the Church of England church of St Stephen, making it a dependent chapelry of the parish of St Mary, Great Shefford. Sunday services at St Stephen's are held once a month. The church is a Grade II listed building.

Amenities
The Pheasant Inn and a childcare centre are just outside the village.

References

External links

St Marys and St Stephens

Villages in Berkshire
West Berkshire District